Sniper: Ghost Shooter is a 2016 American direct-to-video action film. The film is the sixth installment of the Sniper film series and a sequel to Sniper: Legacy (2014).

Plot
Elite snipers Brandon Beckett (Chad Michael Collins) and Richard Miller (Billy Zane) are tasked with protecting a Georgian gas pipeline from terrorists looking to make a statement. When battles with the enemy lead to snipers being killed by a terrorist sniper named Ravshan Gazakov (Velislav Pavlov) who knows their exact location, tensions boil as a security breach is suspected.

Cast
 Chad Michael Collins as Gunnery Sergeant Brandon Beckett
 Billy Zane as Major Richard Miller
 Dennis Haysbert as The Colonel
 Nick Gomez as Miguel Cervantes
 Ravil Isyanov as Colonel Andrei Mashkov
 Stephanie Vogt as Robin Slater
 Enoch Frost as Sergeant Joe Barnes
 Presciliana Esparolini as Gina Aungst
 Dominic Mafham as Major Guy "Bullet Face" Bidwell
 Navid Neghaban as Robert Mothershed
 Naveed Choudry as Saajid
 Vladimir Kolev as Colonel Sergei Babayev
 Velislav Pavlov as Ravshan Gazakov
 Jade Ogugua as Rojas
 Mike Straub as Maines
 Nigel Barber as Killian Grun
 Asen Asenov as The Executioner
 Raymond Steers as Dron Techie
 Elitza Razheva as The Female Thief
 Atanas Srebrev as The CIA Analyst
 Georgi Manchev as The Laptop Militant
 Tihomir Vinchev as The Militant Spotter
 Dimitar Doichinov as Georgian
 Boyan Anev as The Sun-Mask Militant
 Stanimir Stamatov as The Sunglass Man

External links
 
 Sniper: Ghost Shooter at Rotten Tomatoes

2016 action films
2016 films
Films about snipers
Films about terrorism
Films set in Istanbul
Films shot in Istanbul
Films set in Georgia (country)
Films set in Russia
Films shot in Bulgaria
Direct-to-video sequel films
Films about the United States Marine Corps
Films directed by Don Michael Paul
Films scored by Frederik Wiedmann
American action films
Destination Films films
Sony Pictures direct-to-video films
Sniper (film series)
2010s English-language films
2010s American films